"Fool for Your Loving" is a song recorded by British hard rock band Whitesnake. Originally released on their 1980 album Ready an' Willing, it was re-recorded for their 1989 album Slip of the Tongue.

Background and Recording
The song was Co-written by David Coverdale, Bernie Marsden and Micky Moody and was inspired by the breakup of Coverdale's first marriage. In Firecracker magazine, Coverdale said:

"You can look at my first marriage and see "Fool for Your Loving" and "Don't Break My Heart Again." A lot of those were fueled by songs about a relationship that once was very positive but sadly was unfolding into not positive." The song was originally written for blues legend B. B. King.

The song was the first big hit of Whitesnake's, reaching number 13 on the UK Singles Chart and number 53 on the U.S. Billboard Hot 100.
This remains one of Whitesnake's most popular and well-known songs. David Coverdale has stated that he prefers the original to the 1989-version.
A music video was also made, which features the band performing the song live on stage.

Re-recorded
As with the previous album, an old Whitesnake song was re-recorded for the band's 1989-album Slip of the Tongue. This time the band chose their 1980 UK-hit "Fool for Your Loving".
The re-recorded version was the first single released from Slip of the Tongue, but according to David Coverdale, the song "Judgement Day" was originally supposed to be the first single, but the record company insisted on "Fool for Your Loving". In the booklet of Slip of the Tongue 20th Anniversary Edition, David Coverdale comments :

"I was mortified when I allowed myself to be talked into letting Geffen release the re-recorded version of "Fool for Your Loving", instead of "Judgement Day" as the first one out of the box to promote the album... I knew radio would be all over "Judgement Day" just from the market research we did back then... but, Kalodner, Rosenblatt, Marco Babineau, my manager and some of our radio people, all people whose opinions I trusted, came down to the Record Plant when I was finishing off the album and all confronted me with what they felt was the way to go... that it would be a mistake to go with "Judgement Day"... Not only I but the band were really upset about that decision... I've regretted it ever since... I have no doubt it was Kalodner's idea, thinking we could achieve the same as we'd had with the re-recorded "Here I Go Again"... Anyway...they were wrong and so was I to go along with it... Another hard lesson learned... Stick to your guns if you believe in it...It's the only way..."

After its release, the re-recorded version charted  better in the US than the original, reaching number 37 on the Billboard Hot 100, number 2 on the Mainstream Rock Charts, but in the UK it failed to match the original's success, only reaching number 43.

A music video was also made for the song featuring the band performing on a stage, with smoke and headlights. There are also scenes of singer David Coverdale in a padded room and scenes of Coverdale's then-wife, Tawny Kitaen being chased by a car. Guitarist Adrian Vandenberg also appears in the video, even though he does not play on the song, due to a hand injury he sustained prior to the recording.

Track listing
1980
"Fool for Your Loving" - 4:18
"Mean Business" - 3:48
"Don't Mess with Me" - 3:25

1989
"Fool for Your Loving" - 4:10
"Slow Poke Music" - 3:59
"Walking in the Shadow of the Blues" (Live) - 4:49

Personnel
1980
David Coverdale – Vocals
Micky Moody – Guitars
Bernie Marsden – Guitars
Neil Murray – Bass
Ian Paice – Drums
Jon Lord – keyboards

1989
David Coverdale – Vocals
Steve Vai – Guitars
Adrian Vandenberg - Guitars (credited, but does not actually appear)
Rudy Sarzo – Bass
Tommy Aldridge – Drums

Chart performance

References

1980 songs
1980 singles
1989 singles
Whitesnake songs
Songs written by David Coverdale
Songs written by Bernie Marsden
Songs written by Micky Moody
Song recordings produced by Keith Olsen
Song recordings produced by Martin Birch
United Artists Records singles